André Cornélis is a 1927 French silent film directed by Jean Kemm and starring Georges Lannes, Albert Bras and Claude France. It is based on the 1886 novel André Cornélis by Paul Bourget. Kemm had previously directed a 1918 film version of the story.

Cast
 Georges Lannes as Jacques Termonde  
 Albert Bras as Firmin 
 Claude France as Madame Cornélis et Madame Termonde  
 Simone Genevois as Germaine Durieux enfant  
 Jeanne Kervich as Tante Louise  
 Fernand Mailly as Rochedalle  
 Suzy Pierson as Germaine Durieux  
 Nicolas Roudenko as André Cornélis jeune  
 Malcolm Tod as André et Justin Cornélis

References

Bibliography
 Goble, Alan. The Complete Index to Literary Sources in Film. Walter de Gruyter, 1999.

External links

1927 films
Films directed by Jean Kemm
French silent feature films
Films based on French novels
French black-and-white films
1920s French films